Emiel Adrien "Miel" Puttemans (born 8 October 1947) is a retired middle- and long-distance runner, who set world records for 3000 metres (7 minutes 37.6 seconds) in 1972, for 2 miles (8 minutes 17.8 seconds) in 1971, and for 5000 metres (13 minutes 13 seconds) in 1972. He won two European Indoor Championships titles in the 3000 m, in 1973 and 1974, and finished second in 1978.

At the 1972 Summer Olympics, Puttemans won a silver medal in the 10,000 metres and finished in fifth place in the 5000 metres. He then set a world record in the 5000 metres six days after the 1972 games. He also competed in these events at the 1968, 1976 and 1980 Games, but with less success.

In 1982, he won the first edition of the Rome Marathon.

References

External links 

 
 

1947 births
Living people
Belgian male long-distance runners
Belgian male middle-distance runners
Belgian male marathon runners
Olympic athletes of Belgium
Olympic silver medalists for Belgium
Athletes (track and field) at the 1968 Summer Olympics
Athletes (track and field) at the 1972 Summer Olympics
Athletes (track and field) at the 1976 Summer Olympics
Athletes (track and field) at the 1980 Summer Olympics
World record setters in athletics (track and field)
Medalists at the 1972 Summer Olympics
Olympic silver medalists in athletics (track and field)
Belgian male steeplechase runners
Belgian male cross country runners